Pithecellobium decandrum (syn. Albizia decandra) is a species of flowering plant in the legume family, Fabaceae. It is endemic to Brazil, where it occurs in the forests of the Amazon River valley and along its tributaries.

References

decandrum
Endemic flora of Brazil
Trees of Brazil
Least concern plants
Taxonomy articles created by Polbot
Taxobox binomials not recognized by IUCN